Yao Bin (born October 1967) is a Chinese agronomist who is a researcher and vice-president of Chinese Academy of Agricultural Sciences.

Biography
Yao was born in Fuzhou, Jiangxi, in October 1967. He secondary studied at Fuzhou No.3 High School (now Linchuan No.3 High School). He attended Huazhong Agricultural University where he received his bachelor's degree in microbiology in 1988. After completing his master's degree in phytopathology at China Agricultural University, he attended Chinese Academy of Agricultural Sciences where he obtained his doctor's degree in molecular biology in 1994. After graduation, he was offered a faculty position at the academy.

Honours and awards
 November 22, 2019 Member of the Chinese Academy of Engineering (CAE)

References

1967 births
Living people
People from Fuzhou, Jiangxi
Engineers from Jiangxi
Huazhong Agricultural University alumni
China Agricultural University alumni
Members of the Chinese Academy of Engineering